Selah, Salah or Sala ( – Salá) or Shelah is an ancestor of the Israelites and Ishmaelites according to the Table of Nations in . He is thus one of the table's "seventy names".

In the ancestral line from Noah to Abraham, he is the son of Arpachshad (in the Masoretic Text and Samaritan Pentateuch) or Cainan (in the Septuagint) and the father of Eber. The name Eber for his son is the original eponym of the Hebrew people, from the root ‘abar, "to cross over".

The Gospel of Luke and Book of Jubilees both agree with the Septuagint in making Selah the son of Cainan, adding the information that his mother was Milcah (the daughter of Madai), while his wife is named as Mu'ak, daughter of Kesed (another son of Arphachsad).

The death age of Selah is given as 433 (Masoretic), 460 (Septuagint), and 460 (Samaritan).

Henry M. Morris states that Arpachshad, Selah, and Eber are listed as the most important sons since they were in the line of the promised Seed of the Woman.

See also 
 Salih of Thamud

References 

Book of Genesis people
Books of Chronicles people
Gospel of Luke
Noach (parashah)
Book of Jubilees